is a Japanese freestyle wrestler. She won the gold medal in the women's 62 kg event at the 2020 Summer Olympics held in Tokyo, Japan.

In 2018, she won the silver medal in the women's 62 kg event at the World Wrestling Championships held in Budapest, Hungary. A year later, she won one of the bronze medals in this event.

Career 

In 2017, she competed in the women's 63 kg event at the World Wrestling Championships in Paris, France without winning a medal. She won her first match against Elmira Gambarova but she was eliminated from the competition in her next match against Jackeline Rentería of Colombia. Rentería went on to win one of the bronze medals.

She won the gold medal in the women's 62 kg event at the 2020 Asian Wrestling Championships held in New Delhi, India. In the final, she defeated Ayaulym Kassymova of Kazakhstan.

In 2021, Kawai won the gold medal in the 62 kg wrestling division at the Tokyo Olympics. Her older sister Risako won gold in the 57 kg division the following day.

Achievements

References

External links 

 

Living people
1997 births
Japanese female sport wrestlers
World Wrestling Championships medalists
Asian Wrestling Championships medalists
Wrestlers at the 2020 Summer Olympics
Medalists at the 2020 Summer Olympics
Olympic medalists in wrestling
Olympic gold medalists for Japan
Olympic wrestlers of Japan
21st-century Japanese women